Ganesh Vasudeo Joshi (9 April 1828 – 25 July 1880), popularly known as Sarwajanik Kaka, was a lawyer, social reformer, and political activist. He was a founding member of Poona Sarvajanik Sabha. He was a great support system for the noble works initiated and carried out successfully by Honorable Justice Mahadev Govind Ranade. 
He was a social activist in Pune when Maharashtrian revival began, and he was the elderly guiding philosopher when Tilak and Agarkar's generation gave impetus to Indian independence struggle.  Joshi also represented Vasudev Balwant Phadke as his lawyer in Phadke's trial.

Joshi had a daughter who was married to Gopal Krishna Gokhale.

At the Delhi Durbar of 1877, wearing "homespun spotless white khadi" Joshi rose to ask of the Viceroy of India (then the 1st Earl of Lytton), that Her Majesty the Queen might:

Grant to India the same political and social status as is enjoyed by her British subjects.

With this demand, it can be said that the campaign for a free India was formally launched, which was the beginning of a great transformation for India.

Joshi died on 25 July 1880 due to heart trouble.

References 

Indian independence activists from Maharashtra
Marathi people
Indian social reformers

1828 births
1880 deaths